Amin Salman Mosque is a mosque in Djibouti City, Djibouti.

Capacity 
Salman Mosque has the capacity to accommodate up to 1,500 worshippers.

See also 
 Religion in Djibouti
 List of mosques in Africa
 Islam in Djibouti

References 
 

Mosques in Djibouti
Abbasid architecture
Buildings and structures in Djibouti (city)